One News is a 24-hour Philippine pay television and news channel owned by MediaQuest Holdings through its subsidiary Cignal TV. It was launched in May 2018 exclusively on satellite provider Cignal. One News is the first MediaQuest channel launched under the One branding (presently known as the One Network Media Group), along with the free TV sports channel One Sports, cable sports channel One Sports+, Filipino-language news channel One PH, and lifestyle portal One Life,  (now-defunct premium entertainment channel One Screen).

It is an aggrupation of the news division units within the MediaQuest group, namely TV5 Network's News5 division, and the Philstar Media Group's newspapers The Philippine Star and BusinessWorld.

History
Prior to the launch, the channel was then known as Bloomberg TV Philippines from 2015 to 2018. It was a joint-venture of Bloomberg L.P., Cignal TV and TV5 Network.

On May 28, 2018, Cignal TV formally launched One News, an English-language news channel which features content from the news divisions of the MediaQuest group (News5, The Philippine Star and BusinessWorld) as well as Bloomberg TV Philippines and Probe Productions. Most of the programs from its predecessor were retained on this new channel.

In 2019, 5 began airing selected programs from One News, such as Agenda with Cito Beltran and The Chiefs. In addition, a dedicated news website for the said channel was launched and is currently managed by the PhilStar Media Group which is also responsible for the takeover of the InterAksyon website from News5 since 2018.

On March 17, 2020, One News along with One PH, temporarily suspended its regular programming as an effect of the Luzon-wide "enhanced community quarantine" against COVID-19. The news channel aired the special edition of One News Now

Programming
One News program lineup includes national newscasts, talk shows, business newscasts, and public affairs shows. Several programs from Bloomberg Television, One PH, PBA Rush, and Colours as well as third-party content partners (including Probe Productions) are also aired on the channel. Some programs can also be seen on free TV via TV5 and internationally through Kapatid Channel and AksyonTV International.

Current programs

News
 The Big Story 
 One News Now 
 One News Now: Business 
 One News Now: Markets 
 One News Now: Sports 
 One News Now: World 
 Frontline Tonight

Sports
 The Game

Entertainment
 Celebrity Top 10

Talk
 Agenda with Cito Beltran 
 The Chiefs 
 Tik Talks 
 Political Capital 
 Real Deal

Documentary
 Bright Ideas 
 Chronicles 
 One News Documentaries 
 Story Of Our Islands

Infotainment
 #RidePH with Jay Taruc 
 40 is the New 30 
 Basketball Almanac 
 Basketball Science 
 The Philippine Star's Wheels 
 Shotlist

Lifestyle
 Create 
 Discover Eats )
 Life's A Beach
 MomBiz 
 Mom Cafe
 The Philippine Star's Let's Eat
 The Philippine Star's Modern Living

Programs from One PH
 One Balita Pilipinas 
 One Balita Pilipinas (Noontime) 
 One Balita Pilipinas (Evening) 
 One Balita Weekend

Acquired programming
 Game Changers
 Hello World
 Leaders with Lacqua
 Studio 1.0
 David Rubenstein Show
 Bloomberg Green
 What Can Be Saved?
 Sa INC
 BBC Earth on One News
 BBC My WorldFormer programs
 All Politics is Local 

Hosts and news anchors

 Ed Lingao
 Roby Alampay
 Amy Pamintuan
 Luchi Cruz-Valdes
 Cito Beltran
 Regina Lay (Business Editor)
 Jove Francisco
 Danie Laurel
 Shawn Yao 
 Jes delos Santos
 Gretchen Ho 
 Mike Toledo
 Carlo Ople
 RJ Ledesma
 Jay Taruc
 MJ Marfori
 Rizza Diaz
 Paolo del Rosario
 Laura Lehmann
 Diego Castro

One News Now

The hourly newscast One News Now served as temporary, and later permanent, replacement for both Rush (formerly Rush Hour) and One Newsroom on One News starting March 16, 2020 due to the enhanced community quarantine caused by the COVID-19 pandemic. It is currently anchored by Diego Castro III and Shawn Yao on weekdays, and Rizza Diaz on weekends.

Anchors
 Diego Castro III (Morning Edition)
 Danie Laurel (Business and Market)
 Shawn Yao (Afternoon and Evening Edition)
 Rizza Diaz (Weekend Edition)
 Maricel Halili (Weekend Edition)

Substitute Anchors
 Mon Gualvez
 Jes Delos Santos
 Angela Laguzad
 Chiqui Vergel

Upcoming Programs
NewsOne News Now: RegionalOne News Now: EntertainmentOne News Now: Features''

Notes

See also
TV5
AksyonTV (defunct channel)
News5
One PH
Bloomberg TV Philippines (defunct channel)
GMA Integrated News and Public Affairs
ABS-CBN News Channel
CNN Philippines
GTV
TeleRadyo
SMNI News Channel
Golden Nation Network

References

External links
 

24-hour television news channels in the Philippines
Business-related television channels
TV5 Network channels
Television channels and stations established in 2018
Television networks in the Philippines
2018 establishments in the Philippines
English-language television stations in the Philippines
Cignal TV